Northwestern High School may refer to:

Miami Northwestern Senior High School in Miami, Florida
Northwestern High School, in Sciota, Illinois, which was consolidated into West Prairie High School
Northwestern High School (Illinois) in Palmyra, Illinois
Northwestern High School (Indiana) in Kokomo, Indiana
Northwestern High School (Baltimore) in Baltimore, Maryland
Northwestern High School (Hyattsville, Maryland) in Hyattsville, Maryland
Northwestern High School (Michigan) in Detroit, Michigan
Flint Northwestern High School in Flint, Michigan
Northwestern High School in Mendon, Missouri
Northwestern High School (Springfield, Ohio) in  Springfield, Ohio
Northwestern High School (West Salem, Ohio) in  West Salem, Ohio
Northwestern Senior High School (Pennsylvania) in Albion, Pennsylvania
Northwestern High School (Rock Hill, South Carolina) in Rock Hill, South Carolina
Northwestern High School (Wisconsin) in Maple, Wisconsin

See also 
Northwest High School (disambiguation)